The  Denver Broncos season was the fourth season for the team in the American Football League (AFL). They finished with a record of two wins, eleven losses, and one tie, and finished fourth in the AFL's Western Division, and also the worst record in the league. The Broncos went winless in their final 10 games of the season.

The Broncos had the fewest passing yards in the AFL in 1963, throwing for only 2,487 yards, or 177.6 yards per game. For comparison, the league's top passing team — the Houston Oilers — threw for 229.2 yards per game. Curiously, Broncos wide receiver Lionel Taylor led the league with 78 receptions.

The Broncos allowed 473 points in 1963, the most in the history of the AFL, and second most all time for a 14-game season. The Broncos' 40 passing touchdowns allowed in 1963 were the most in the history of pro football until the New Orleans Saints broke the record in 2015.

Personnel

Staff

Regular season

Standings

References

External links 
 1963 Denver Broncos at Pro-Football-Reference.com

Denver Broncos seasons
Denver Broncos
Denver Broncos